Chácara is a municipality in the Brazilian state of Minas Gerais. Its population was estimated at 3,186 as of 2020.

References

Municipalities in Minas Gerais